Traina (also known as Mazra`at Turayna) is a village in southern Qatar located in the municipality of Al Wakrah.

Nearby settlements include Al Aamriya in Al Rayyan Municipality to the west, Khawr al Udayd to the south-east and Al Kharrara to the north.

Etymology
Traina was named posthumously after an esteemed woman named Tarina died in the area.

Gallery

References

Populated places in Al Wakrah